The following articles list major achievements in team sports and individual sports by nation:

Team sport 

*Sports (and forms of a sport) shown in bold are currently on the program of the Olympic Games.
†Sports (and forms of a sport) shown in italic are currently on the program of the Paralympic Games.

Individual sport 

*Sports (and classes, disciplines or forms of a sport) shown in bold are currently on the program of the Olympic Games.
†Sports (and classes, disciplines or forms of a sport) shown in italic are currently on the program of the Paralympic Games.

See also 
 Olympic Games
 Paralympic Games
 World championship

References 

Achievements
Achievements